= Sarah Bauerle Danzman =

American political scientist

- Citizenship: American
- Education: Villanova University (BA), University of North Carolina at Chapel Hill (PhD)
- Occupation: Political scientist
- Employer: Indiana University Bloomington
- Organization: Council on Foreign Relations
- Website: https://www.sarahbauerledanzman.com

Sarah Bauerle Danzman is an American political scientist. She is currently an associate professor of international studies at Indiana University Bloomington and a nonresident senior fellow at the Atlantic Council's GeoEconomics center. Her research focuses on the political economy and national security implications of foreign investment regulations.

== Education ==
Bauerle Danzman holds a BA in political science and economics from Villanova University and a PhD in political science from the University of North Carolina at Chapel Hill.

== Awards ==
In 2020, the National Science Foundation awarded Bauerle Danzman and political scientist William Kindred Winecoff a $450,000 grant for their research project exploring state-business relations.

== Publications ==
=== Books ===
- Danzman, Sarah Bauerle (2019-12-19). Merging Interests: When Domestic Firms Shape FDI Policy. Cambridge University Press. ISBN 978-1-108-49414-4.
